Shermantown can refer to:
 Shermantown (Atlanta), a late 19th-century African-American shantytown east of downtown Atlanta, Georgia
 Shermantown, a historically African-American neighborhood of Stone Mountain, Georgia